Pyrox Island is an island lying at the head of Neny Fjord, along the west coast of Graham Land. First surveyed by the United States Antarctic Service (USAS), 1939–41. Resurveyed in 1949 by the Falkland Islands Dependencies Survey (FIDS), who so named it because of pyroxenic rocks found there.

See also 
 List of Antarctic and sub-Antarctic islands

Islands of Graham Land
Fallières Coast